William Jenkins (13 September 1813–26 September 1902) was a New Zealand sailor, whaler, accommodation-house keeper, farmer, market gardener, horse-trainer and jockey. He was born in Isle of Sheppey in Kent, England on 13 September 1813.

References

1813 births
1902 deaths
New Zealand farmers
New Zealand sailors
New Zealand people in whaling
People from the Isle of Sheppey
English emigrants to New Zealand